Nina Petrovna Valetova, or Nina Tokhtaman Valetova, born November 19, 1958, is a Russian-American metaphysical realism painter.

Nina Valetova was born in Berdyash, Bashkir Autonomous Soviet Socialist Republic, Russian SFSR, Soviet Union and graduated as a Specialist from the Faculty of Arts and Graphics of Bashkir State Pedagogical Institute in Ufa. She immigrated to the United States in 1993.
Nina Valetova is the developer of Synthesis Art Style in visual art, - painting and drawing, that combines abstract, figurative arts with cubism, suprematism and surrealism.

Works in public collections 
Her work is in the collections of the Moscow Museum of Modern Art, Moscow, Russia, Chuvash State Art Museum, Cheboksary, Russia, Novocheboksarsk Art Museum, Novocheboksarsk, Russia, and Omsk Center of Contemporary Art, Omsk, Russia.

Exhibitions 
She has exhibited at the Chuvash State Art Museum, Cheboksary, Russia; Manege, Moskva (Moscow), Russia; Arthaus Gallery, Dallas, TX, U.S.A.; and Boulevard Galerie, Kopnhavn (Copenhagen), Denmark.

Gallery 
Oil paintings

References

External links 
Wikiart.org 
Instagram 
Youtube 

1958 births
Living people
People from Bashkortostan
American contemporary painters
Russian surrealist artists
American surrealist artists
Women surrealist artists
Visionary artists
Fantasy artists
20th-century Russian painters
21st-century Russian painters
American women painters
Russian women artists
Russian women painters
20th-century American painters
20th-century American women artists
21st-century American women artists
20th-century Russian women